Campbelltown City Soccer Club is an Australian association football club based in Adelaide, South Australia. Campbelltown competes in Australia's second-tier, NPL South Australia, playing home matches at Newton Village Sports Complex and are the local club of the Campbelltown-Newton area in Adelaide's north-east suburbs.

History

Campbelltown City Soccer & Social Club "Red Devils" were formed by Joe Natale and other Italian Migrants in 1963, needed players to field a side when they debuted in the old SA third division the following year. But Natale's recruitment drive faced some hurdles, not least City's tin shed change room and the patch of dirt which passed as its original pitch. Campbelltown claimed its maiden league title in 1966 and won promotion to the SA top flight eight years later. in 2020 Campbelltown were NPL1 champions of South Australia for the third successive season.

Current squad

Honours
 National Premier Leagues National Champions: 2018
 NPL South Australia Champions: 2013, 2016, 2018, 2019, 2020
 NPL South Australia Premiers: 2018, 2019
 State League: 2003
 Division 1: 1986, 2013
 Division 2: 1973, 1978, 1993
 Division 3: 1966, 1971

References

External links
 Official website

National Premier Leagues clubs
Soccer clubs in South Australia
Association football clubs established in 1963
1963 establishments in Australia